The bi-metallic Thailand ten-baht coin is a denomination coin of the Thai baht, the currency unit of Thailand. 

Like every standard-issue coin in Thailand, its obverse features the King of Thailand, Vajiralongkorn Bodindradebayavarangkun and previously Bhumibol Adulyadej. The newest coin features King Vajiralongkorn's royal monogram on its reverse side while the previous set featured Wat Arun Ratchawararam Ratchawora Mahavihara seen from the Chao Phraya River. 

Ten-baht coin has been used as a commemorative coin for many occasions since 1971. As of March 2012, there are one silver, twenty-three nickel, twenty-three cupronickel and fifty-eight bi-metallic face-valued ten-baht commemorative coin series.

Features
Raised dots corresponding to Braille cell dot 1 and dots 2-4-5, which correspond to the number 10, are at the 12 o'clock position on the reverse of the standard-issue 10-baht coin. Braille enumeration does not appear on coins of other denominations, nor on ten-baht coins frequently issued as commemorative coins (for example, the 50th and 60th Anniversary of Accession to the Throne of King Bhumibol Adulyadej.)

The bi-metallic ten-baht coin is very similar to the two–euro coin, which first minted in 2002, in size, shape and weight and likewise consists of two different alloys. Vending machines that are not equipped with an up-to-date coin-checking system might therefore accept them as €2 coins. This similarity is because both coins are minted on the model of the defunct Italian 500 lire coin, the world's first modern bi-metallic coin. To mint its 10 baht coin in 1988, the Thai government had to be allowed by the Italian mint, which had an international copyright over bi-metallic minting. The 10 baht is a perfect copy of the 500 lire coin even in its alloy, being made of acmonital for the outer ring and bronzital for the centre plug, but slightly larger (26 mm to 25.80 mm) and heavier (8.5 g to 6.8 g).

Series

2009 changes
In 2009, a new series of Thai baht coins were released in circulation. The Ten-baht coin was issued for this series, the difference is the redesign of the portrait of King Bhumibol Adulyadej on the obverse, to reflect his current age. The reverse side remained the same from previous issues.

2018 series 
The Ministry of Finance announced on March 28, 2018 that the first coins featuring the portrait of His Majesty King Maha Vajiralongkorn Bodindradebayavarangkun will be put in circulation on April 6.

Mintages 
 1988 ~ 60,200
 1989 ~ 100,000,000
 1990 ~ 100
 1991 ~ 1,380,650
 1992 ~ 13,805,000
 1993 ~ 10,556,000
 1994 ~ 150,598,831
 1995 ~ 53,700,000
 1996 ~ 17,086,000
 1997 ~ 9,310,600
 1998 ~ 980,000
 1999 ~ 1,030,000
 2000 ~ 1,666,000
 2001 ~ 2,060,000
 2002 ~ 61,180,000
 2003 ~ 49,263,000
 2004 ~ 38,591,000
 2005 ~ 108,271,000
 2006 ~ 109,703,000
 2007 ~ 161,897,000
 2008 (old series) ~ 209,800,000
 2008 (new series) ~ 16,750,000
 2009 ~ 41,657,733

Design
See information box for standard issue, and see below for commemorative issues.

Commemorative issues

Silver coin 
 the 25th Anniversary Celebrations of the King Bhumibol Adulyadej's Accession

Nickel coin 
 Commemoration of Crown Prince Vajiralongkorn's marriage ceremony
 Commemoration of Princess Sirindhorn graduated from Chulalongkorn University
 Commemoration of Princess Chulabhorn Walailak graduated from Kasetsart University
 the 80th Anniversary of Princess Mother Srinagarindra
 the 30th Anniversary of The World Fellowship of Buddhists
 Commemoration of the King Bhumibol Adulyadej's accession as two times as the King Mongkut
 the 50th Anniversary of the Queen Sirikit
 the 75th Anniversary of World Scout
 the Centenary of Thai Post
 the 700th Anniversary of Lai Su Thai (Thai script)
 the 84th Anniversary of Princess Mother Srinagarindra
 the 72nd Anniversary of Government Saving Bank
 the National Years of the Tree 1985-1987, Thailand
 the 5th Cycle Birthday of the King Bhumibol Adulyadej
 Rajamagalapisek Royal Ceremony
 the 6th ASEAN Orchid Congress
 Commemoration of the King Bhumibol Adulyadej for Outstanding Leadership in Rural Development
 the Centenary of Chulachomklao Royal Military Academy
 Commemoration of Princess Chulabhorn Walailak, the researcher princess
 the 72nd Anniversary of National Cooperatives
 the 36th Anniversary of Crown Prince Vajiralongkorn
 the Centenary of Siriraj Hospital
 the 72nd Anniversary of Chulalongkorn University

Cupronickel coin 
 the 90th Anniversary of Princess Mother Srinagarindra
 the Centenary of the Siriraj Pattayakorn School
 the Centenary of the Comptroller General's Department
 the 36th Anniversary of Princess Sirindhorn
 the Centenary of Prince Mahidol Adulyadej
 the 80th Anniversary of Thai Scout
 Commemoration of Princess Mother Srinagarindra for her public health work
 the Centenary of Ministry of Interior
 the Centenary of Ministry of Justice
 Ramon Magsaysay Award: Public Service to Princess Sirindhorn
 the Centenary of Ministry of Agriculture and Cooperatives
 the 60th Anniversary of National Assembly of Thailand
 the 5th Cycle Birthday of the Queen Sirikit
 the 64th Anniversary of the King Bhumibol Adulyadej as the same age as the King Mongkut
 the 50th Anniversary of Bank of Thailand
 the Centenary of Thai Teacher Education
 the Centenary of the Thai Red Cross Society
 the 60th Anniversary of Treasury Department
 the Centenary of Office of the Attorney General
 the Centenary of the King Prajadhipok
 the 60th Anniversary of the Royal Institute
 the 60th Anniversary of Thammasat Universary
 the 120th Anniversary of the Privy Council and the Council of State

Bi-metallic coin 
 FAO's Agricola Medal to the King Bhumibol Adulyadej
 the 50th Anniversary Celebrations of the King Bhumibol Adulyadej's Accession
 IRRI's International Rice Award Medal to the King Bhumibol Adulyadej
 the Centenary of the King Chulalongkorn's Europe visit
 Commemoration of the King Nangklao (Nangklao)
 the 13th Asian Games
 the 6th Cycle Birthday of the King Bhumibol Adulyadej
 the Centenary of the General Hospital
 the 125th Anniversary of Custom Department
 the Centenary of Thai Army Medicare
 the 50th Anniversary of Office of the National Economic and Social Development Board
 the 80th Anniversary of Ministry of Commerce
 the Centenary of Department of Lands
 the Centenary of Princess Mother Srinagarindra
 the 90th Anniversary of BMA Medical College & Vajira Hospital
 the 90th Anniversary of Department of Highways
 the Centenary of Royal Irrigation Department
 the 60th Anniversary of Department of Internal Trade
 the 20th World Scout Jamboree
 the 75th Anniversary of the King Bhumibol Adulyadej
 the 80th Anniversary of Princess Galyani Vadhana
 the Centenary of Inspector General Department, Royal Thai Army
 the 90th Anniversary of Government Savings Bank
 the 150th Anniversary of King Chulalogkorn
 the 11th APEC Summit
 the 70th Anniversary of the Royal Institute
 the 6th Cycle Birthday of the Queen Sirikit
 the Commemorative of Anti-Drug Campaign
 the 70th Anniversary of Thammasat University
 the Bicentenary of the King Mongkut
 the 3rd IUCN World Conservation Congress (Bangkok World Conservation Congress 2004)
 the 13th Meeting of the Convention on International Trade in Endangered Species of Wild Fauna and Flora
 the Centenary of Department of Army Transportation
 the 72nd Anniversary of Treasury Department
 the 72nd Anniversary of the Secretariat of the Cabinet
 the 80th Anniversary of Princess Bejaratana
 the 25th Asia-Pacific Scout Jamboree
 Commemoration of the Blessing and Naming Rites of Prince Dipangkorn Rasmijoti
 the 130th Anniversary of Office of the Auditor General of Thailand
 the 60th Anniversary Celebrations of the King Bhumibol Adulyadej's Accession
 the 150th Anniversary of Prince Chaturonrasmi
 the Centenary of Judge Advocate General's Department
 Commemorative of WHO's Food Safety Award to the Queen Sirikit
 the Centenary of the 1st Cavalry Regiment, King's Guard
 the Centenary of Siam Commercial Bank
 the 50th Anniversary of the Medical Technology Council
 the 24th Summer Universiade
 the 75th Anniversary of the Queen Sirikit
 the 9th Congress of International Association of Supreme Administrative Jurisdictions
 the 80th Anniversary of the King Bhumibol Adulyadej
 the 24th SEA Games
 the 120th Anniversary of Siriraj Hospital
 the 125th Anniversary of Thailand Post
 the 50th Anniversary of National Research Council of Thailand
 the 84th Anniversary of HRH Princess Bejaratana Rajasuda
 the 60th Anniversary of Office of the National Economic and Social Development Board
 the 120th Anniversary of The Comptroller General’s Department
 the 100th Anniversary of The Fine Arts Department

References 

Currencies introduced in 1988
Coins of Thailand
Bi-metallic coins
Ten-base-unit coins